Emmett Ripley Cox (February 13, 1935 – March 3, 2021) was a Senior United States circuit judge of the United States Court of Appeals for the Eleventh Circuit and a former United States District Judge of the United States District Court for the Southern District of Alabama.

Education and career

Born in Cottonwood, Alabama, Cox received an Artium Baccalaureus degree from the University of Alabama in 1957 and a Bachelor of Laws from the University of Alabama School of Law in 1959. He was in the United States Air National Guard from 1958 to 1964, and was in private practice in Birmingham, Alabama from 1959 to 1964, and in Mobile, Alabama from 1964 to 1981.

Federal judicial service

On October 14, 1981, Cox was nominated by President Ronald Reagan to a seat on the United States District Court for the Southern District of Alabama vacated by Judge Thomas Virgil Pittman. Cox was confirmed by the United States Senate on November 18, 1981, and received his commission the same day. His service terminated on April 25, 1988, due to elevation to the Eleventh Circuit.

On December 19, 1987, Reagan nominated Cox to a seat on the United States Court of Appeals for the Eleventh Circuit vacated by Judge John Cooper Godbold. Cox was again confirmed by the Senate, on April 15, 1988, and received his commission on April 18, 1988. He assumed senior status on December 18, 2000. He died on March 3, 2021, aged 86.

References

Sources
 

|-

1935 births
2021 deaths
20th-century American judges
Judges of the United States Court of Appeals for the Eleventh Circuit
Judges of the United States District Court for the Southern District of Alabama
People from Houston County, Alabama
United States court of appeals judges appointed by Ronald Reagan
United States district court judges appointed by Ronald Reagan
University of Alabama School of Law alumni